China XD Group (Chinese “中国西电集团”) is a Chinese state-owned power engineering company and manufacturer of electrical equipment. The company was established in July 1959 and was formerly known as Xi'an Electric Machinery Manufacturing Company (Chinese 西安电力机械制造公司). It was also known as Xi'an XD, Xi'an Xidian, Xi'an Electric (Chinese “西电” for short.)

Business overview 
XD Group's main business includes the research and development, design, production, sales and examinations of power transmission and distribution and control equipment, relevant equipment technology and service in a complete set, engineering contracting, etc. Its core business is the production, the research and development and the examinations of high voltage, extra high voltage and extreme high voltage AC/DC power transmission and distribution equipment. Its leading products include 110KV and above voltage level of high-voltage switches (GIS, GCB, isolating switches, ground switches), transformers (power transformers, converter transformers), reactors (smoothing reactors, shunt reactors), power condensers, instrument transformers (CVT, CT, PT), insulators (power substation electric porcelain products, composite insulator products), cannula, zinc oxide arresters, direct current transportation valves, etc. After a half century's struggle and development, XD Group has become the production base of high-voltage, extra high voltage and extreme high voltage AC/DC power transmission and distribution equipment and other electrical products.

At present, XD Group owns over 40 wholly owned enterprises or holding enterprises, during which there’re 10 large or medium key production enterprises and 3 research institutions (including 3 national testing centers). It has more than 18,000 employees, and over 3000 of them are engineers and technicians, including 529 persons with intermediate and senior professional titles, 35 experts enjoying the government special subsidy that the State Council distributes, and 49 young experts with outstanding contributions at the provincial and municipal level. During the years, XD Group has made progress in the key technical field of extreme high voltage universal power transmission and distribution equipment, in researching and developing line products for 750KV power network, and developed 800kV GIS, couple cut-off pot-type breakers, isolating switches and transformers of 750kV, reactors, lightning arresters, etc.

As China's experimental research establishment of high voltage, intense current and large capacity AC/DC, XD Group's subordinate research institutions have become not only the member of the International Electrotechnical Commission (IEC) and International Conference on Large High Voltage Electric Systems (CIGRE), but also the specified administrative department of IEC in China and the relevant international Secretariat. In recent years, according to the needs of the national key projects and market, XD Group has been continuously intensifying research and technical reforms, therefore it has accomplished more than 1300 items of new key products developed by itself, among which 281 items reached international most advanced level, 230 items reached national most advanced level, 11 items won national scientific and technical awards, 136 items won provincial or ministerial scientific and technical awards, as well as 260 patents were authorized and 2 items got the copyright of computer software.

Acting as the head of power transmission and distribution equipment production industry in China, XD Group promotes the technology of power transmission and distribution equipment in China and providing key equipment for national key engineering projects. It once provided complete sets of power transmission and distribution equipment and services for our national key engineering projects one after another, such as China's first 330kV and 550kV High Voltage DC Transmission Engineering, the first 750kV Extra High Voltage AC Transmission Engineering, the first ±100kV High Voltage DC Transmission Engineering, the first ±500kV Extra High Voltage DC Transmission Engineering, the first ±800kV Extreme High Voltage DC Transmission Engineering, the first power supply network from the northwest to the North China back-to-back DC Transmission Engineering, Three Gorges Project, and west–east electricity transmission project. Among them, the products, like transformers of 750kV, reactors, lightning arresters, capacitor voltage transformers and isolating switches of 800kV, have been operated successfully in 750kV model projects in the northwest; China's first 800kV double cut-off pot-style breakers has been put into operation at Yinchuan East Transformer Substation. Besides, XD Group first developed and stored relevant technologies of AC 1100kV and DC ±800kV Extreme High Voltage products in China, provided such products as 1000kV GIS, reactors, capacitor voltage transformers, lightning arresters, ground switches, insulator, etc., for the megavolt model line “southeast Shanxi—Nanyang—Jingmen Model Project” and such products as transformers, valves, capacitor, lightning arresters, etc., for the megavolt model line “Yunnan—Guangzhou” ±800kV Extreme High Voltage DC Transmission Project. On the international markets, XD Group's products and technology have been exported to more than 40 countries and regions and succeeded in entering the markets of some developed countries and regions, such as Germany, America, Singapore, Hong Kong, etc.

Business areas
At present, China XD Group owns over 40 wholly owned enterprises or holding enterprises, including 10 large or medium key production enterprises and 3 research institutions (including 3 national testing centers). It has more than 18,000 employees, and over 3,000 of them are engineers and technicians.

China XD Group's main business includes the research and development, design, production, sales and examinations of power transmission and distribution and control equipment, relevant equipment technology and service in a complete set, engineering contracting, etc. Its core business is the production, the research and development and the examinations of high voltage, extra high voltage and extreme high voltage AC/DC power transmission and distribution equipment. Its leading products include 110 kV and above voltage level of high voltage switches (GIS, GCB, isolating switches, ground switches), transformers (power transformers, converter transformers), reactors (smoothing reactors, shunt reactors), power condensers, instrument transformers (CVT, CT, PT), insulators (power substation electric porcelain products, composite insulator products), cannula, zinc oxide arresters, direct current transportation valves, etc. China XD Group is the production base of high voltage, extra high voltage and extreme high voltage AC/DC power transmission and distribution equipment and other electrical products.

As China's experimental research establishment of high voltage, intense current and large capacity AC/DC, XD Group's subordinate research institutions have become not only the member of the International Electrotechnical Commission (IEC) and International Conference on Large High Voltage Electric Systems (CIGRE), but also the specified administrative department of IEC in China and the relevant international Secretariat.

Wind farm
As its first major wind power project, XD will assist Uzbekistan in constructing wind farms. A Memorandum of Understanding (MoU) has been signed with Uzbekenergo, the country's governing body for energy, to conduct a feasibility study on the establishment of wind farms.

History
China XD Group was established in July, 1959. On the basis of 5 projects of the 156 key construction projects in the first five-year plan, it has developed to be a large-size enterprise group taking research institutions and backbone enterprises as its core as well as merging research, development, production, trade and finance as an organic whole. In 2001, being approved by the State Administration for Industry and Commerce of the People's Republic of China, China XD Group was established formally with XD Company as its parent company. In 2003, XD Company became the only central enterprise of the power transmission and distribution industry under the supervision of the State Property Management Commission of the State Council. On May 6, 2009, being approved by the State Administration for Industry and Commerce of the People's Republic of China, China XD Company formally changed its name to be China XD Group and decided to name it China XD Group for short.

The company has supplied to national engineering projects, such as China's first 330 kV and 550 kV High Voltage DC Transmission Engineering, the first 750 kV Extra High Voltage AC Transmission Engineering, the first ±100 kV High Voltage DC Transmission Engineering, the first ±500 kV Extra High Voltage DC Transmission Engineering, the first ±800 kV Extreme High Voltage DC Transmission Engineering, the first power supply network from the northwest to the North China back-to-back DC Transmission Engineering, Three Gorges Project, and west–east electricity transmission project. Among them, the products, like transformers of 750 kV, reactors, lightning arresters, capacitor voltage transformers and isolating switches of 800 kV, have been operated successfully in 750 kV model projects in the northwest; China's first 800 kV double cut-off pot-style breakers has been put into operation at Yinchuan East Substation. Besides, XD Group first developed and stored relevant technologies of AC 1100 kV and DC ±800 kV Extreme High Voltage products in China, provided such products as 1000 kV GIS, reactors, capacitor voltage transformers, lightning arresters, ground switches, insulator, etc., for the megavolt model line “Southeast Shanxi-Nanyang-Jingmen Pilot Project” and such products as transformers, valves, capacitor, lightning arresters, etc., for the megavolt model line “Yunnan-Guangzhou” ±800 kV Extreme High Voltage DC Transmission Project. On the international markets, China XD Group's products and technology have been exported to more than 40 countries and regions and succeeded in entering the markets of some developed countries and regions, such as Germany, America, Singapore, Hong Kong, Egypt etc.

A future growth area the company has focused in on is breakthrough in extreme high voltage universal power transmission and distribution equipment, led the way in China in researching and developing line products for 750 kV power network, and succeeded in developing 800 kV GIS, couple cut-off pot-type breakers, isolating switches and transformers of 750 kV, reactors, lightning arresters, etc.

References

External links
 http://www.xd.com.cn/structure/eng/index.htm – Official site 
 http://www.xd.com.cn                         – Official site 

Electrical equipment manufacturers
Manufacturing companies based in Xi'an
Government-owned companies of China
Manufacturing companies established in 1959
Electrical engineering companies
Chinese companies established in 1959
1959 establishments in China